Edgar Harvey Hennis House is a historic home located at Mount Airy, Surry County, North Carolina. It was built in 1909, and is a -story, three bay by eight bay, Late Victorian / Colonial Revival style brick veneer dwelling.  It has a two-story rear ell with two-tier porch, a hipped roof with multiple projecting gables, four corbelled interior chimneys, and a wraparound porch.

It was listed on the National Register of Historic Places in 1986.

References

Houses on the National Register of Historic Places in North Carolina
Victorian architecture in North Carolina
Colonial Revival architecture in North Carolina
Houses completed in 1909
Houses in Surry County, North Carolina
National Register of Historic Places in Surry County, North Carolina
Mount Airy, North Carolina